Aurélien Faivre (born 22 June 1978) is a French former professional footballer who played as a defender. He played at a professional level in Ligue 2 for Besançon RC, Libourne, and Vannes.

References
 
 
 

1978 births
Living people
Sportspeople from Besançon
French footballers
Football Bourg-en-Bresse Péronnas 01 players
Association football defenders
Racing Besançon players
Nîmes Olympique players
FC Libourne players
Vannes OC players
Jura Sud Foot players
Ligue 2 players
Championnat National players
Championnat National 3 players
Championnat National 2 players
Footballers from Bourgogne-Franche-Comté